The 2011–12 season was Brighton & Hove Albion's first  year in the Championship, returning after being promoted as champions of League One during the 2010–11 season. It was also Brighton's first season at their new home, the Falmer Stadium.

The season was a successful one for the club, finishing 10th in the league, and reaching the Third Round of the League Cup and Fifth Round of the FA Cup (coincidentally being knocked out by eventual League Cup Champions and FA Cup runners up Liverpool on both occasions). Ashley Barnes was top scorer in both the league and across all competitions.

League table

Squad statistics

Statistics

|-
|colspan="14"|Players currently out on loan:

|-
|colspan="14"|Players featured for club who have left:

|}

Starting 11
These are the most used starting players in the most used formation throughout the complete season

Formation: 4–4–2

Top scorers

Disciplinary record

Matches

Pre-season friendlies

Championship

Result round by round

FA Cup

League Cup

Transfers

References

Brighton & Hove Albion F.C. seasons
Brighton and Hove Albion